Run Silent, Run Deep is the first album by Terminal Power Company. It was recorded in two weeks in November 1990, for the Beggars Banquet sub-label Situation Two. The album was recorded at Expresso Bongo studios in Taworth and was partly mixed by Paul Speare, former saxophonist with Dexys Midnight Runners.

The album feature samples from various Science fiction movies, notably Blade Runner and Akira.

Track listing
 "The Hunger, the Heat" - 3:16
 "Deeper" - 3:35
 "Salvation" - 3:38
 "Slow Motion Riot" - 3:20
 "Burning Chrome" - 3:05
 "Ice" - 1:11
 "Blood, Flesh and Sand" - 3:32
 "Fire" - 3:00
 "Getting the Fear" - 3:39
 "Wired II" - 3:10
 "Urban Psycho" - 7:00

Personnel
Paul Aspel
John Roome
Matt Waddle (assistant producer and engineer)

External links
 Album page on Discogs

1992 debut albums
Beggars Banquet Records albums
Situation Two albums